Maria Fareri Children's Hospital, a member of the Westchester Medical Center Health Network (WMCHealth), is the advanced care pediatric hospital for New York's Hudson Valley region and Fairfield County, Connecticut. Maria Fareri Children's Hospital is part of the Valhalla, NY campus of WMCHealth along with Westchester Medical Center and the Behavioral Health Center.  It is home to hundreds of clinical and surgical pediatric specialists in almost every medical field. The hospital treats about 20,000 patients each year. The hospital cares for infants, children, teens, and young adults age 0-21 throughout upstate New York.

As part of Westchester Medical Center Health Network, an academic health affiliate of New York Medical College, Maria Fareri Children's Hospital is also a major teaching facility.

History

Maria's Wish 
Maria Fareri Children's Hospital was built through the efforts of hundreds of parents, medical professionals, and community leaders, including Brenda and John Fareri who lost their 13-year-old daughter, Maria, to rabies in 1995. After Maria died, her parents learned that Maria had made a special wish as part of a school project - for the health and well-being of all the children in the world. Guided by Maria's wish, the Fareri family helped lead the design and creation of Maria Fareri Children's Hospital as a “family-centered” hospital. It is the only hospital in the United States named after a child.

Pediatric Specialties 
MFCH offers advanced healthcare in the following specialties:

References 

Children's hospitals in the United States
Hospital buildings completed in 2005
Hospitals in New York (state)
Hospitals in Westchester County, New York
Pediatric trauma centers
Children's hospitals in New York (state)